Sherwood is a village in Branch County of the U.S. state of Michigan.  The population was 309 at the 2010 census.

The village is in Sherwood Township near the St. Joseph River.

Geography
The ZIP code is 49089 and the FIPS place code is 73420.

Demographics

2010 census
As of the census of 2010, there were 309 people, 106 households, and 77 families residing in the village. The racial makeup of the village was 95.1% White, 0.6% African American, 3.6% Native American, and 0.6% from two or more races. Hispanic or Latino of any race were 0.3% of the population.

There were 106 households, of which 40.6% had children under the age of 18 living with them, 50.0% were married couples living together, 12.3% had a female householder with no husband present, 10.4% had a male householder with no wife present, and 27.4% were non-families. 20.8% of all households were made up of individuals, and 10.4% had someone living alone who was 65 years of age or older. The average household size was 2.92 and the average family size was 3.32.

The median age in the village was 39.2 years. 23.9% of residents were under the age of 18; 11.7% were between the ages of 18 and 24; 26.6% were from 25 to 44; 26% were from 45 to 64; and 12% were 65 years of age or older. The gender makeup of the village was 50.5% male and 49.5% female.

2000 census
As of the census of 2000, there were 324 people, 114 households, and 93 families residing in the village. The racial makeup of the village was 96.60% White, 0.62% African American, 0.93% Native American, and 1.85% from two or more races. Hispanic or Latino of any race were 0.62% of the population.

There were 114 households, out of which 41.2% had children under the age of 18 living with them, 57.9% were married couples living together, 15.8% had a female householder with no husband present, and 18.4% were non-families. 14.9% of all households were made up of individuals, and 8.8% had someone living alone who was 65 years of age or older.  The average household size was 2.84 and the average family size was 3.04.

In the village, the population was spread out, with 30.9% under the age of 18, 9.9% from 18 to 24, 28.7% from 25 to 44, 22.2% from 45 to 64, and 8.3% who were 65 years of age or older.  The median age was 31 years. For every 100 females, there were 109.0 males.  For every 100 females age 18 and over, there were 103.6 males.

The median income for a household in the village was $39,844, and the median income for a family was $41,250. Males had a median income of $31,429 versus $25,893 for females. The per capita income for the village was $16,101.  About 8.3% of families and 10.6% of the population were below the poverty line, including 16.5% of those under age 18 and 8.3% of those age 65 or over.

References

Villages in Branch County, Michigan
Villages in Michigan